Mark Ross Pellegrino (born April 9, 1965) is an American actor of film and television. He is best known for his work as Lucifer in Supernatural, Paul Bennett in Dexter, Jacob in Lost, James Bishop in Being Human, Clayton Haas in ABC's thriller Quantico, and Deputy Bill Standall in 13 Reasons Why.

Early life
Mark Pellegrino is a German-American born in Los Angeles, California.

He went to a Notre Dame High School. Through this school he started to study the act of respecting.

He grew up in Van Nuys, California. During this time he went to college, got straight As, worked at a gas station, and then proceeded to drop out after a year. After he dropped out he realized he needed to do something with his life and saw an advertisement for a modeling agency at a place called John Roberts Powers, where he received some free training for a while. During his training there he was picked out for talent by commercial agent Bob Hoover. He was set up with an agent and acting coaches. From there he was sent out into the world of acting and discovered the Meisner acting method. He had no dream to become an actor at the time.

His biological father's name is Jerry who is of German descent. He had a step-father named Bill Pellegrino who his mother divorced when he was two years old. He went through his whole life thinking Bill was his biological father. To gather more information about his background he did a search on ancestry.com to find out his heritage. He found out through the website he did not have any Italian blood in his DNA. Before the COVID pandemic he asked fans of TV show Supernatural on Twitter if they be interested in finding his real father. Within an hour of posting his father was found along with the knowledge of having two sisters and three brothers.

Career
Pellegrino's first appearance into television was on season 2, episode 2 of the series L.A. Law.

Some of his earlier appearances are also in Northern Exposure, ER, Without a Trace, NYPD Blue, CSI: Crime Scene Investigation. He played the Blonde Treehorn Thug #2 who stuffs The Dude's head down the toilet and drops his bowling ball, breaking the floor tile, in the cult film The Big Lebowski. In 1999 he appeared in season 7, episode 3 of The X-Files as a disgruntled fast food joint employee. He was featured in National Treasure as the background FBI agent known as Agent Johnson.

He portrayed terrorist bomber Bobby James on The Beast. In 2001 he played a hitman in David Lynch's critically acclaimed Mulholland Drive.

In 2005 he appeared in the Academy Award winning film Capote, playing murderer Dick Hickock.

In 2006 he played Sadik Marku, an Albanian mob boss, in two episodes of Without a Trace. The first episode was in season 4, episode 22 where he guest starred alongside Mark Sheppard who played Crowley in Supernatural. The second episode was in season 5, episode 5 where he guest starred alongside Rachel Miner who played Meg Masters also which is a role in Supernatural.

In March 2009 he was cast on the ABC series Lost for an appearance in the final 2 episodes of Season 5, to play the role of the mysterious Jacob. Although the press release for the episode refers to his character simply as man No. 1, the episode revealed that he portrayed Jacob, a mysterious character pivotal to the show's plot.

On June 26, 2009, it was also announced that he was cast in a recurring role as Lucifer in season 5 of the CW series Supernatural. He played a recurring role as Lucifer in season 7, and a main role as his character in seasons 12 and 13. He played a main role in season 14 as Nick, Lucifer's vessel, and was a special guest in season 15.

In 2011 he portrayed James Bishop, the leader of a vampire clan based in Boston, in the SyFy horror series Being Human in the first season, and reprised his role in seasons 2-4 as a recurring guest.

In 2011 he and Curtis Armstrong, who played Metatron on Supernatural, guest starred alongside each other as well as their characters being enemy lawyers in season 7 of The Closer.

In 2012 he played a man that took a hit out on his wife, who also took one out on him, Daniel Drake in season 2, episode 8 of Person of Interest.

In 2015 he joined the ABC thriller series Quantico playing the recurring role of Clayton Haas.

In 2018 he voiced and motion captured his first video game role as antagonist Jacob Seed in one Ubisoft's Far Cry 5.

In 2021 he played Virgil Poe in Showtime's American Rust series, a show based on the novel of the same name written by Philipp Meyer.

In September 2022, he was announced to play an unknown role in Beverly Hills Cop: Axel Foley.

Personal life
He is married to Tracy Pellegrino. He sometimes teaches at Playhouse Paris, which is a Meisner training school his wife owns and runs in Paris, France.

His favorite thing to do in the world is to teach history.

He is an atheist.

He is a follower of Objectivism, a philosophy created by Russian-American writer Ayn Rand. Before that he used to be an environmentalist and a registered Democrat, One of the ways he spreads Rand's views is through a YouTube platform called the Ayn Rand Centre UK.

He has described his political views as classical liberalism.

He is a co-founder of The American Capitalist Party. The party stands for individual rights, limited constitutional government, and laissez-faire capitalism.

Filmography

Film

Television

Video Games

References

External links

One on One with Mark Pellegrino

1965 births
20th-century American male actors
21st-century American male actors
American male film actors
American male television actors
Living people
Male actors from Los Angeles
Objectivists
American atheists